This page indexes the individual year in Icelandic music pages. Each year is annotated with a significant event as a reference point.


2010s - Pre-2010s

2010s
 2017 in Icelandic music, death of Jórunn Viðar.
 2016 in Icelandic music
 2015 in Icelandic music
 2014 in Icelandic music
 2013 in Icelandic music
 2012 in Icelandic music
 2011 in Icelandic music
 2010 in Icelandic music

Pre-2010s
 2009 in Icelandic music

 Iceland
Iceland years
Years in music